is a Quasi-National Park in Ehime Prefecture and Kōchi Prefecture, Japan. The park's central feature is the eponymous Mount Ishizuchi.

Related municipalities
 Ehime Prefecture: Kumakōgen, Saijō
 Kōchi Prefecture

See also

 List of national parks of Japan

References

External links
 Detailed map of Ishizuchi Quasi-National Park 

National parks of Japan
Parks and gardens in Ehime Prefecture
Kumakōgen, Ehime
Saijō, Ehime
Parks and gardens in Kōchi Prefecture
Protected areas established in 1955
1955 establishments in Japan